Joseph Patrick Rogers Sr. (September 30, 1924 – April 1, 2011) was an American football player and coach.  He served as the interim head football coach at Villanova University for the final six games of the 1959 season, compiling a record of 1–5, including the team's only win of the season.

High School Career 
Joe Rogers was named all-scholastic athlete for both football and basketball at Roman Catholic High School in Philadelphia. He played under Jordan Olivar, who served as a mentor for much of Joe's professional career.

College career 
After serving in the US Coast Guard from 1943 to 1945, Rogers entered Villanova University as a freshman in 1946 where he played halfback for the Wildcats.

Rogers led the Wildcats in both scoring and rushing in 1946 with seven touchdowns for 42 points and 90 carries for 620 yards. As a freshman, he averaged 6.9 yards per carry which ranked 12th nationally.

In a game against Detroit on September 30, 1949, Rogers’ senior year, he caught an 83-yard touchdown pass from Stephen Romanik. This play still ranks as the second longest pass play in Villanova football history.

During Rogers’ four-year playing career, Villanova tallied a 28–10 record and played in two bowl games, including the 1947 Great Lakes Bowl, in which he served as Captain (24-14 win over Kentucky) and the 1948 Harbor Bowl (27-7 loss to Nevada).

Rogers was inducted into the Villanova Varsity Club Hall of Fame in 1979.

Coaching career

Waldron Academy 
Rogers served as athletic director and head football coach at Waldron Academy from 1950 to 1952.

Villanova University

Freshman Coach (1952-1955) 
Rogers was the freshman coach from 1952 to 1955. In addition to coaching, Rogers was largely responsible for all scouting duties associated with the team. He had tremendous success with Villanova's freshman eleven.

Varsity Backfield Coach (1955-1959) 
In August 1955, Rogers was promoted to varsity backfield coach after the job was vacated by Bob Snyder, who had accepted an assistant coaching position with the Pittsburgh Steelers.

Interim Head Coach and Professional Scouting (1959-1960) 
In October 1959, Villanova head coach, Frank Reagan, stepped down and appointed Joe, his first assistant, to serve as interim head coach for the remainder of the season. That year, Rogers coached Villanova to its only victory of the season.

Joe was offered the permanent head coaching position in 1960, but turned down the offer. He also turned down several coaching offers, including one in Canada, to remain at Villanova as Coordinator of Alumni Programs. He also worked as a scout for the Green Bay Packers during this time.

Varsity Backfield Coach (1961-1966) 
Frank Reagan convinced Joe to come back to Villanova as Varsity Backfield Coach in 1961. He resigned in 1966 at the age of 41.

Professional 
In 1966, Rogers resigned from his Villanova position to accept a backfield coaching position for the Atlantic City Senators in the ACFL. He coached many household names here, including: Tom Urbanik, former Penn State fullback; Glynn Griffing, former reserve quarterback of the New York Giants, and Mark Lichtenfeld, formerly of Temple University.

Rogers then went on to work as defensive coach for the Philadelphia Bulldogs of the Continental Football League under the direction of Wayne Hardin.

After a stint as defensive coach for the Pottstown Firebirds, Rogers was promoted to defensive coordinator in March 1969. Firebirds head coach, Dave DiFilippo, credited Rogers with the team's successful 1968 season and called Rogers "the best defensive coach in the ACFL."  In 1969, the Firebirds won the ACFL Championship 31–0 against the Hartford Knights.

Rogers permanently retired from full-time coaching in 1970, citing frequent travel as the main reason. Rogers noted his desire to spend more time at home with his wife and nine children.

Later Years 
After retiring from full-time coaching in 1970, Rogers went on to have a successful career as a Sales Manager for Independence Blue Cross. He was also a frequently sought after public speaker, presiding over many Philadelphia-area athletic ceremonies and conferences.Joe was inducted into the Villanova Varsity Club Hall of Fame in 1979. Joe Rogers died on April 1, 2011, at his home in Bala Cynwyd, Pennsylvania, leaving behind 9 children, 30 grandchildren, and many great-grandchildren. He was predeceased by his wife Nora (née Cassidy) in 2009.

Head coaching record

References

1924 births
2011 deaths
American men's basketball players
American football halfbacks
Villanova Wildcats football coaches
Villanova Wildcats football players
Villanova Wildcats men's basketball players
Sportspeople from Philadelphia
Players of American football from Philadelphia